In Classical Greek, Lethe (Λήθη;) literally means "forgetfulness" or "concealment" and is related to the Greek word for "truth": a-lethe-ia (αλήθεια), meaning "un-forgetfulness" or "un-concealment".  The River Lethe in Greek Mythology has appeared many times in popular culture since the times of ancient Greece.

Comics and manga
In the Japanese manga Saint Seiya, written and illustrated by Masami Kurumada, the river Lethe appears in the third act, the Hades arc. The river Lethe is mentioned several times as the boundary between the Underworld and the Elysion, the paradise of the Greek deities and heroes. It also appears in the anime adaptation of the manga, depicted in the same manner as the source material.

In Marvel Comics Zeus drinks from Lethe before he is reborn, causing him to forget his life. Later Hercules uses the water to help defeat Typhon.

In the Japanese manga Sailor Moon, written and illustrated by Naoko Takeuchi, the "River of Forgetfulness" appears in act 56, the seventh act of the Stars arc. Sailor Lethe, guardian of the planet Lethe, is the watchman of the river. Sailor Lethe's much less aggressive sister, Sailor Mnemosyne, is the watchman of the "River of Memory." When the main character, Sailor Moon, falls into Lethe's river, she loses all sense of her memory, as do the rest of her allies when they fall in. Sailor Moon is able to regain her memory, but Princess Kakyuu must drink from Mnemosyne's River of Memory in order to snap out of Lethe's spell.

Films
In Roy Andersson's You, the Living, a quotation from Goethe's Roman Elegies "Be pleased then, you the living, in your delightfully warmed bed, before Lethe’s ice-cold wave will lick your escaping foot" is presented as an epigraph. Later, a tram is seen with "Lethe" as its destination.

Music
The Society of Orpheus and Bacchus, a men's a cappella group from Yale University, released an album in 1992 entitled "Drinking from Lethe."
In Tony Banks' first solo album, A Curious Feeling, where he tells the story of a man who makes some kind of pact with the devil and finishes by losing his memory, the ninth song is called "The Waters of Lethe".
In composer Thomas Adès' String Quartet, "Arcadiana," Op. 12,  "Lethe" is the title of the work's seventh and final movement.
Clutch, rock band from Germantown, Maryland, references the river in the song "American Sleep" on their "Pure Rock Fury" album: "Companion chimera, Lethean grazer."
American rock supergroup The Company Band, also featuring Neil Fallon of Clutch, have a song called "Lethe Waters" on their eponymous debut album.
The Swedish melodic death metal band Dark Tranquillity, released the song "Lethe" in their album "The Gallery" in 1995.
 The second movement of Thomas Sleeper's concerto for trumpet is called "...the river lethe".
 In Nicholas Lanier's "No More Shall Meads be deckt with Flowers", there is a line, "Black Lethe shall oblivion leave, before my Celia I deceive...".
 The aria "Leave me loathsome light", from George Frideric Handel's Semele, contains the line "Lethe, why does thy ling'ring current cease? Oh murmur me again to peace!".
 Flemish folk artist Miel Cools recorded a ballad called "Lethe".
 Black metal bands Nightbringer recorded a song called "The River Lethe" and Nocte Obducta an album "Lethe".
 The Swedish/Finnish melodic death metal supergroup Solution .45 released the song "Lethean Tears" in their album "For Aeons Past" in 2010.
 Death Metal one-man band Mindpath did a reference to Lethe on the song Nostalgia from the album In A State Of Full Consciousness
 Gothic Metal band Tristania recorded a song called "Lethean River", from their album "Beyond the Veil" in 1999.
 Dark metal band Throes Of Dawn have a song entitled "Lethe" from their 2010 album "The Great Fleet Of Echoes".
 To Sail Lethe metalcore band from Independence, Missouri.
 Norwegian rock band Motorpsycho have an instrumental song called "La Lethe" on their album The Death Defying Unicorn.
 American experimental rock band Kayo Dot recorded a song entitled "Lethe," featured on their 2012 album Gamma Knife.
 French doom and depressive black metal band Lethian Dreams also take their name from river Lethe.
 Black metal band Satanochio released a song titled "Lethe" on their second full-length album, From Beyond.
 British rock band Radiohead took heavy inspiration from Lethe, as well as general themes of memory and forgetfulness, for their fifth studio album, Amnesiac.
 Kristin Hersh has a song titled "Lethe" on her album Possible Dust Clouds.

Novels

Dan Simmons' Hyperion contains a chapter titled "The River Lethe's Taste is Bitter", so named because the daughter of main character of the chapter suffers from a malady which causes her to age backwards, thus forgetting her life and family one day at a time. 

In Rick Riordan's novels, The Heroes of Olympus series and the short story Percy Jackson and the Sword of Hades in The Demigod Files reference and portray this river in their plot. 

James L. Grant's horror novel, On the Banks of Lethe, a reference to the books theme of lost memories.

In chapter 4 of Nathaniel Hawthorne's novel, The Scarlet Letter, Roger Chillingworth claims, "I know not Lethe nor Nepenthe."

In Robert A. Heinlein's Time Enough for Love there is a reference to "Neolethe" (see the chapter entitled Counterpoint I), which is apparently a powerful sedative.

In Toni Morrison's novel Beloved, the main character's name is Sethe, a pseudonym based on the idea of the power of water, particularly the motif that water can weather her past.

In Bram Stoker's Dracula, Dr. Abraham Van Helsing states to Lucy "It smell so like the waters of Lethe..."(Stoker, 192) talking about the garlic which he was going to place around her room so the Dracula would not suck her blood.

C. S. Lewis refers to Lethe in The Great Divorce when he writes, “‘It is up there in the mountains, very cold and clear, between two green hills. A little like Lethe. When you have drunk of it you forget forever all proprietorship in your own works". The Spirit who talks about the fountain is describing Heaven to an artist, telling him that soon he will forget all ownership of his work.

In the volume, Swann's Way, of Marcel Proust's novel, À la recherche du temps perdu (In Search of Lost Time), the narrator comments, as he recollects a seemingly lost memory, "...trying to remember, feeling deep within myself a tract of soil reclaimed from the waters of Lethe slowly drying until the buildings rise on it again;"

The unnamed narrator of Sasha Sokolov's first novel, A School for Fools, has a significant habit of referring to the river running through his neighborhood in the Russian countryside as Lethe.

Henry David Thoreau wrote in Walking: "The Atlantic is a Lethean stream, in our passage over which we have had an opportunity to forget our Old World and its institutions.  If we do not succeed this time, there is perhaps one more chance for the race left before it arrives on the banks of the Styx; and that is in the Lethe of the Pacific, which is three times as wide."

In chapter 17 of Graham Greene's novel The Tenth Man, the protagonist Charlot watches the charlatan Carosse beguile the vulnerable Mademoiselle Mangeot: "He knew the game so well, Charlot thought: the restless playboy knew how to offer what most people wanted more than love--peace.  The words flowed like water--the water of Lethe."

In Stephen King's novel Rose Madder, Rose, in preparation for retrieving the title character's child from a labyrinth, is warned not to drink from the water from a river she must cross. Later in the story, a few drops of that water, mixed in a soft drink, is used to remove Bill's memories of the latter part of the book's events.

In Piers Anthony's With a Tangled Skein, Niobe accompanies her daughter and granddaughter on a quest
to acquire an enchanted paint brush and a harp.  During the quest, the trio must cross an illusory representation of the Lethe.  Later, in Hell, Niobe must again cross a river, and wonders if it might be the actual Lethe.

In Valeer Damen’s novel KATABASIS, one of the main characters has to find and cross the river Lethe as a step in the process of entering the afterlife. “‘There is the plain. Transit. Like a battlefield. All the energy totals of actions and thoughts are there. Wind blows. Tests are there, functionaries, agents from above and below. Introduction functionary cannot help solve tests or help in final adjudication. In the end, river.’” (Damen, 21).

In Virginia Woolf's novel Orlando, the protagonist considers "drinking forgetfulness" from a meadow pool.

In K. Madill's debut novel 'The Stolen Herd' Lethe is a naiad who lives in a lake at the Gates to the Underworld.

In William Faulkner's novel "Go Down Moses" Lathe appears in chapter 1.2 of "The Fire and the Hearth".

Plays
[[File:Eurydice Ruhl Shimer College Eurydice finds father lost.jpg|thumb|Eurydice's dead father falls unconscious after dipping himself in the Lethe, in a performance of Ruhl's Eurydice at Shimer College.]]
In William Shakespeare's play Julius Caesar, Antony, on seeing the murderers' hands red with Caesar's blood, observes: "Here didst thou fall; and here thy hunters stand,/Sign'd in thy spoil, and crimson'd in thy Lethe" (III.i.215).
 Additionally, the character of Sebastian refers to Lethe in Shakespeare's Twelfth Night: "Let fancy still my sense in Lethe steep; If it be thus to dream, still let me sleep!" (IV.ii.61).

In William Shakespeare's play Hamlet, Hamlet's father's Ghost says to the prince, "I find thee apt, And duller shouldst thou be than the fat weed That roots itself in ease on Lethe wharf, Wouldst thou not stir in this." (Act 1, scene V). 

In Antony and Cleopatra, Sextus Pompey talks of Antony's supposed military inertia, hoping that "Epicurean cooks / Sharpen with cloyless sauce his appetite, / That sleep and feeding may prorogue his honour / Even till a Lethe'd dullness-" (II.i.24-27).

In John Webster's play The White Devil, the duke Brachiano in his death throes says to Vittoria, whose husband he conspired to murder, along with his own wife:
Brac. I have drunk Lethe. Vittoria? / My dearest happiness? Vittoria? (IV.ii.129-30)

In Samuel Beckett's radio play Embers, the main character Henry describes conversing with his dead wife: "that's what hell will be like, small chat to the babbling of Lethe about the good old days when we wished we were dead".

In Sarah Ruhl's Eurydice, the river Lethe is a central theme of the play. All the shades must drink from Lethe and become like stones, speaking in their inaudible language and forgetting everything of the world.

Metastasio's opera libretto Artaserse references the River Lethe in one of Artabano's arias, Su le sponde del torbido Lete, originally set to music for a tenor voice by Leonardo Vinci. In the aria, Artabano sings of the recently murdered Serse as waiting for revenge on the banks of the turbid Lethe.

In Haydn's opera Orlando Paladino, Orlando is so consumed by his unrequited love for Angelica that it drives him to insanity and in order to rid him of his insanity, and the sorceress Alcina sends him to the underworld and orders Caronte to bathe him in the waters of the River Lethe to make him forget about Angelica and regain his sanity.

In Offenbach's operetta Orpheus in the Underworld, the character John Styx drinks the waters of Lethe in a deliberate attempt to forget things. His forgetfulness is a significant factor in the plot of the last act.

In the musical Jasper in Deadland, a character representing Hades named Mr. Lethe tries to enlist the help of Jasper to get water from the river to the living world so people will forget about their lives.

Poetry
Walter Savage Landor transforms into substance the metaphor that time takes flight when he places a few drops of Lethe's waters on wing:
On love, on grief, on every human thing,
Time sprinkles Lethe's water with his wing.

In The Divine Comedy, the stream of Lethe flows to the centre of the earth from its surface, but its headwaters are located in the Earthly Paradise found at the top of the mountain of Purgatory. Souls about to enter Heaven drink from it to forget their sins.

In John Keats' poem, "Ode on Melancholy", the first line begins "No, no! Go not to Lethe". In his Ode to a Nightingale the narrator sinks "Lethe-wards," that is, into the "drowsy numbness" of the river. 

The fourth stanza of the fourth canto of Byron's "Don Juan" reads: "And if I laugh at any mortal thing,
'T is that I may not weep; and if I weep,
 'T is that our nature cannot always bring
 Itself to apathy, for we must steep
 Our hearts first in the depths of Lethe's spring,
 Ere what we least wish to behold will sleep:
 Thetis baptized her mortal son in Styx;
 A mortal mother would on Lethe fix."
In his poem "The Sleeper," Edgar Allan Poe describes a 'sleeping' "universal valley" that includes a Lethe-like body of water.  "Looking like Lethe, see! the lakeA conscious slumber seems to take,And would not, for the world, awake."

Charles Baudelaire's poem "Spleen" ends with the lines "II n'a su réchauffer ce cadavre hébétéOù coule au lieu de sang l'eau verte du Léthé" ("He failed to warm this dazed cadaver in whose veinsFlows the green water of Lethe in place of blood."). Baudelaire also wrote a poem entitled "Le Léthé" ("Lethe"), in which an adored but cruel woman serves as a metaphor for the oblivion of the river Lethe.
French Romantic poet Alphonse de Lamartine refers to the Lethe river in "Le Vallon" (The Vale) J'ai trop vu, trop senti, trop aimé dans ma vie;
Je viens chercher vivant le calme du Léthé.
(I have seen too much, felt too much, loved too much in my life;
I come to seek, still living, the calm of Lethe.)

Pushkin's verse novel "Eugene Onegin" also contains three separate references to the Lethe (Лета) including this most poignant one in Lensky's soliloquy in Chapter 6, Stanza XXII as he awaits his fate at the dueling ground:
А я, быть может, я гробницы
Сойду в таинственную сень,
И память юного поэта
Поглотит медленная Лета,
Забудет мир меня;
     but I perhaps will be declining
     into the tomb's mysterious shade;
     the trail the youthful poet followed
     by sluggish Lethe may be swallowed,
     and I be by the world forgot;

In Hymn to Proserpine (1866) by Algernon Charles Swinburne, the line "We have drunken of things Lethean..." laments the decline of pagan tradition and beliefs in ancient Rome following the endorsement of Christianity as the official religion.

The river is also mentioned in at least one of the poems of Victorian classicist and poet A. E. Housman (XXIII from More Poems).
"Crossing alone the nighted ferry
   With the one coin for fee,
Whom, on the wharf of Lethe waiting,
   Count you to find? Not me.
 
The brisk fond lackey to fetch and carry,
   The true, sick-hearted slave,
Expect him not in the just city
   And free land of the grave."

Here the role of the Lethe as the final barrier to be crossed before reaching Elysium is invoked (NB "Lethe" is better rhyme for "ferry" than is "Stix") and the poem as a whole seems to reflect the associations of the Lethe with forgetfulness and escape from ones former life.

The Edna St. Vincent Millay poem "Lethe" describes the river as "the taker-away of pain,And the giver-back of beauty!"
In "The Scarlet Woman", a poem by African-American poet Fenton Johnson (1888–1958), a young woman resorts to prostitution in order to avoid starvation. The poem concludes with the lines "Now I can drink more gin than any man for miles around.Gin is better than all the water in Lethe."

Sylvia Plath has alluded to Lethe in multiple poems, particularly in those written for Ariel. For example, both "Amnesiac" (21 October 1962) and "Getting There" (6 November 1962) reference the river: "Getting There" ends with the lines "And I, stepping from this skinOf old bandages, boredoms, old facesStep up to you from the black car of Lethe,Pure as a baby."
while the final stanza of "Amnesiac" ends with "O sister, mother, wife,Sweet Lethe is my life.I am never, never, never coming home!"

The river Lethe is mentioned in Allen Ginsberg's poem "A Supermarket in California". "Ah, dear father graybeard, lonely old courage-teacher, what America did
you have when Charon quit poling his ferry and you got out on a smoking
bank and stood watching the boat disappear on the black waters of
Lethe?" (Berkeley, 1955)

Billy Collins, in his poem "Forgetfulness", refers to "a dark mythological riverwhose name begins with an L as far as you can recall".

in "Sonnet V: To the River Downs" Charlotte Smith asks the river Lethe for forgetfulness:
"As to the sea your limpid waves you bear, 
Can you one kind Lethean cup bestow, 
To drink a long oblivion to my care?"
Also mentioned in Byron's poem "Remember Thee! Remember Thee!".

In the Aeneid by Vergil, in book 6 Aeneas sees the future Roman heroes drinking from the River Lethe. "The drink the soothing fluid and long forgetfullness"

Emily Dickinson mentions the "Lethe" in her poetry (#1730 by Thomas Johnson editing).

Science
Dr. William T.G. Morton, who first publicly demonstrated the use of ether as an anesthetic, called his ether "Letheon".

Television
In the Cartoon Network series Adventure Time, the protagonists travel to the underworld in season two, episode seventeen "Death in Bloom." In this episode, Jake drinks from an unnamed river (presumably the Lethe) and loses his memories.

In the Andromeda seadon 1 episode "The Banks of the Lethe", a black hole enables communication between a pair of separated lovers.

In the Buffy the Vampire Slayer episode "Tabula Rasa", Willow uses a flower called Lethe's Bramble as a material component to a spell that temporarily erases the memory of her friends.

In Hercules: The Animated Series, the waters of the Lethe are used in two episodes: "Hercules and the Pool Party", where Hades uses a Lethe Pool of Forgetfulness to erase the memories of the other Olympian gods, and "Hercules and the Aetolian Amphora", where a young Megara steals an amphora full of waters from the Pool of Forgetfulness to erase bad memories of a date with Adonis, encountering and then forgetting Hercules in the process. 

In Peaky Blinders season 5, episode 6: "Mr. Jones", Tommy Selby, who (along with his brother Arthur and their fellow WWI combat veteran Barney) has been shown to be suffering from post-traumatic stress disorder, visits the Margate, Kent home of Alfie Solomons, whom he had shot on the beach in the season 4 finale. Prominently written on Alfie's tile doormat is the word "LETHE".

The river is featured in the season 3 finale episode of the Disney Original series So Weird, titled "The River".

In the Star Trek: The Original Series episode "Dagger of the Mind", one of the penal colony residents who is blank and emotionless is introduced as "Lethe". This is a reference to her memories' having been wiped by the neural neutralizer, a supposed medical device that is only later shown to be extremely dangerous.

In the Japanese series Ultraman Nexus, a recurring character is the machine known, as Lethe. It is capable of sealing memories, making people unable to access them.

"Lethe" is the title of Star Trek: Discovery Season 1, Episode 6.

Video Games
The fourth act of Kentucky Route Zero'' is set on Lake Lethe, where a pair of scientists are studying memory loss.

References

Greek underworld in popular culture